Trial and Error is Jack Woodford's book on writing and the publishing industry. The book focuses on writing and editing and describes the behind-the-scenes machinations that result in the final publication of writing. 

The book was instrumental in the writing careers of Ray Bradbury, Robert A. Heinlein, Jerry Pournelle, Piers Anthony, and Richard A. Lupoff. The Notebooks of Raymond Chandler contain a paraphrased excerpt from Trial and Error that Chandler wrote from memory, entitled "Jack Woodford's Rules for Writing a Novel." 

The introduction was written by the founder of Esquire magazine Arnold Gingrich.

1933 non-fiction books
Books about publishing
American non-fiction books